Joe or Joseph Power may refer to:

 Joe Power (ice hockey) (1885–1935), Canadian politician and ice hockey player
 Joe Power (hurler) (1883–?), Irish hurler
 Joe Power (psychic) (born 1966)
 Joseph Power (librarian), librarian of the University of Cambridge
 Joseph Withers Power, Mississippi politician